The Widerøe C.5 Polar, sometimes known as the Honningstad C.5 Polar, was a Norwegian general-purpose land or floatplane built by Widerøes Flyveselskap.

Design and development
The Norwegian airline Widerøe decided in the late 1940s to design and build a general-purpose aircraft for its own use. Built in the airline's workshops, the Widerøe C.5 Polar was a braced high-wing monoplane which could be operated on floats, skis, or wheels. It had an enclosed cabin for a pilot and up to five passengers, and the passenger seats were removable to enable the aircraft to be used for freight or as an air ambulance. The first C.5 Polar was built and flown in 1948.

Operational history
A small number of aircraft entered service with the Widerøes Flyveselskap airline.

Operators

Widerøes Flyveselskap

Specifications (Polar landplane)

References

Citations

Bibliography

Further reading 

1940s Norwegian civil utility aircraft
Floatplanes
Polar
High-wing aircraft
Single-engined tractor aircraft
Aircraft first flown in 1948